Direct fire or line-of-sight fire refers to firing of a ranged weapon whose projectile is launched directly at a target within the line-of-sight of the user. The firing weapon must have a sighting device and an unobstructed view to the target, which means no obstacles or friendly units can be between it and the target. A weapon engaged in direct fire conversely exposes itself to direct return fire from the target.

This is in contrast to indirect fire, which refers to firing a projectile on a curved ballistic trajectory or delivering self-accelerated munitions capable of long range and various degrees of homing abilities to alter the flight path. Indirect fire does not need a direct line-of-sight to the target because the shots are normally directed by a forward observer. As such, indirect-fire weapons can shoot over obstacles or friendly units and the weapons can be concealed from counter-battery fire.

Description

Examples of direct-fire weapons include most ancient and modern weapons such as slings, bows, firearms, and recoilless rifles. The term is most often used in the context of artillery, such as howitzers and mortars.

Direct fire remained the dominant method of operating artillery throughout most of human history, with indirect fire used for sieges and involving specific siege guns. Technological developments born of the Industrial Revolution and the development of technical practices in the late 19th century led to an appreciation of indirect fire, although it was not until World War I that indirect fire supplanted direct fire as the primary method by which artillery supported the other combat arms. During World War II direct fire remained secondary to indirect fire, although it was used profusely in situations where indirect fire was less effective, and new direct-fire artillery such as anti-tank guns and anti-aircraft guns were developed.

After World War II new technology continued to diminish the role of direct fire; however, in several situations it remains a necessary function on the modern battlefield. One of these is the defense of fixed fortified areas – for example fire support bases – for which specific firing techniques and munitions such as Killer Junior and Beehive anti-personnel rounds were developed. Another is when artillery is forced to defend itself, such as in a surprise attack. This could be the result of rapid maneuvering by ground forces, an attack by airborne troops, or from the lack of defined front lines as found in counterinsurgency operations. Direct-fire artillery can also be massed to counter a penetration by enemy tanks. In particular self-propelled artillery are ideally suited for this role on account of their mobility, armor protection, and faster rate of fire compared to other weapons. A final situation is in urban warfare, where locating the enemy can be difficult, the physical structures give the defenders better protection, and the risk of collateral damage is high. In these cases direct-fire artillery can unleash tremendous firepower to precisely destroy enemy fortified positions. For example, during the Siege of Marawi, the Armed Forces of the Philippines used 105mm M101 howitzers in close-range to combat Abu Sayyaf and Maute Group terrorists who fortified themselves in several buildings.

See also

References

Footnotes

Bibliography

Artillery operation
Military terminology